Prince Vinny Ibara Doniama (born 7 February 1996) is a Congolese professional footballer who plays as a forward for Indian Super League club Bengaluru and the Congo national team.

Club career
Ibara began his career at Congolese side ACNFF in 2014. He later moved to AS Pélican of Gabon Championnat National D1 and CA Bizertin of Tunisia before joining Qatar Stars League side Al-Wakrah in 2017.

On 11 July 2018, Ibara joined USM Alger for three seasons, coming from Al-Wakrah To be an alternative to the striker Oussama Darfalou, also became the first Congolese to play in USM Alger. In the first, USMA signed with Zimbabwean Charlton Mashumba but the arrival of the new coach Thierry Froger, who decided to contract with another foreign player in his place. Ibara made his debut for USM Alger in the CAF Confederation Cup during a win against Rayon Sports, later on 14 August, he made his debut in the Ligue 1 against DRB Tadjenanet as a starter and scored his first goal with his new club in 3–1 victory. The following season, he scored nine goals helping the club clinching the 2018–19 Algerian Ligue Professionnelle 1 title.

In July 2019, he signed for Belgian First Division A club K Beerschot VA.

On 11 September 2020, Neftchi Baku announced the signing of Ibara on one-year long loan. The loan ended early and he moved on loan to French club LB Châteauroux in January 2021.

In July 2021, he moved to Indian Super League club Bengaluru FC, on a two year deal ahead of the Blues' 2021 AFC Cup qualifying play-offs. He made his ISL debut on 20 November against NorthEast United FC in a 4–2 win, in which he scored a goal.

International career
He made his international debut for Congo in 2016, in a friendly match against Morocco. On 11 October in the 2019 Africa Cup of Nations qualifier, Ibara scored his first international goal in a 3–1 win against Liberia.

Career statistics

Club

International goals
Scores and results list Congo's goal tally first.

Honours
USM Alger
 Algerian Ligue Professionnelle 1: 2018–19.
Al-Wakrah
 Qatari Second Division: runner-up 2017–18

Bengaluru
 Durand Cup: 2022

References

External links

Player profile at Indian Super League

1996 births
Living people
Republic of the Congo footballers
Republic of the Congo international footballers
ACNFF players
AS Pélican players
CA Bizertin players
Al-Wakrah SC players
USM Alger players
K Beerschot VA players
Neftçi PFK players
LB Châteauroux players
Bengaluru FC players
Tunisian Ligue Professionnelle 1 players
Qatar Stars League players
Algerian Ligue Professionnelle 1 players
Challenger Pro League players
Azerbaijan Premier League players
Ligue 2 players
Association football forwards
Republic of the Congo expatriate footballers
Republic of the Congo expatriate sportspeople in Gabon
Expatriate footballers in Gabon
Republic of the Congo expatriate sportspeople in Tunisia
Expatriate footballers in Tunisia
Republic of the Congo expatriate sportspeople in Qatar
Expatriate footballers in Qatar
Republic of the Congo expatriate sportspeople in Algeria
Expatriate footballers in Algeria
Republic of the Congo expatriate sportspeople in Belgium
Expatriate footballers in Belgium
Republic of the Congo expatriate sportspeople in Azerbaijan
Expatriate footballers in Azerbaijan
Republic of the Congo expatriate sportspeople in France
Expatriate footballers in France
Republic of the Congo expatriate sportspeople in India
Expatriate footballers in India